Scopula anysima  is a moth of the family Geometridae. It was described by Prout in 1938. It is endemic to Guatemala.

References

Moths described in 1938
anysima
Endemic fauna of Guatemala
Taxa named by Louis Beethoven Prout
Moths of Central America